In the Beginning is the debut studio album by British ten-piece hip-hop group Blazin' Squad. The album was released on 25 November 2002 in the United Kingdom through East West Records. It peaked at number 33 on the UK Albums Chart. The album contains the top 10 singles "Crossroads", "Love on the Line" and the double A-side "Reminisce" / "Where the Story Ends". The album features the radio edit of "Crossroads", running at 3:10, instead of the full-length version, which runs at 3:50.

Track listing

Special edition

Notes
 signifies an original producer
 signifies a remixer
"All About the Music" features samples from the recordings "Broken Mirrors", "The Human Fly", "Bamboo Birdcage", "The Big Battle" and "Sampans" by Lalo Schifrin.

Charts

Weekly charts

Year-end charts

Certifications

References

2002 debut albums
Blazin' Squad albums
Albums produced by Cutfather
East West Records albums
Albums produced by Richard Stannard (songwriter)